In linguistics, a suffix is an affix which is placed after the stem of a word. Common examples are case endings, which indicate the grammatical case of nouns, adjectives, and verb endings, which form the conjugation of verbs. Suffixes can carry grammatical information (inflectional suffixes) or lexical information (derivational/lexical suffixes). An inflectional suffix or a grammatical suffix. Such inflection changes the grammatical properties of a word within its syntactic category. For derivational suffixes, they can be divided into two categories: class-changing derivation and class-maintaining derivation.

Particularly in the study of Semitic languages, suffixes are called affirmatives, as they can alter the form of the words. In Indo-European studies, a distinction is made between suffixes and endings (see Proto-Indo-European root). Suffixes can carry grammatical information or lexical information.

A word-final segment that is somewhere between a free morpheme and a bound morpheme is known as a suffixoid or a semi-suffix (e.g., English -like or German -freundlich "friendly").

Examples

English 
Girls—where the suffix -s marks the plurality.
He makes—where suffix -s marks the third person singular present tense.
It closed—where the suffix -ed marks the past tense.

French 
De beaux jours—where the suffix -x marks the plural.
Elle est passablement jolie—where the suffix -e marks the feminine form of the adjective.

German 
mein Computer—where the lack of suffixes is because its case, nominative, is "unmarked"
meines Computers—genitive case
meinem Computer—dative case
meinen Computer—accusative case

Russian 
мой компьютер—where the lack of suffixes is because its case, nominative, is "unmarked"
моего компьютера—genitive case
моему компьютеру—dative case
мой компьютер—accusative case
за-туш-и-ть свечу—where first word has -и- suffix, -ть ending (infinitive form); second word with ending -у (accusative case, singular, feminine).
добр-о-жел-а-тель-н-ый—добр- root, -о- interfix, -жел- root, verbal -a- interfix, nominal -тель suffix, adjectival -н- suffix, adjectival -ый ending (nominative case, singular, masculine).

Barngarla
wárraidya "emu" — where the lack of suffixes is because its grammatical number, singular, is "unmarked"
wárraidyalbili "two emus" — dual
wárraidyarri "emus" — plural
wárraidyailyarranha "a lot of emus", "heaps of emus" — superplural

Inflectional suffixes 
Inflection changes the grammatical properties of a word within its syntactic category. In the example:
I was hoping the cloth wouldn't fade, but it has faded quite a bit.
the suffix -d inflects the root-word fade to indicate past participle.

Inflectional suffixes do not change the word class of the word after the inflection. Inflectional suffixes in Modern English include:

Verbs 

-s third person singular simple present tense
-ed past tense and past participle
-t past tense (weak irregular)
-ing present participle and gerund
-en past participle (irregular)

Nouns 

-s plural number
-en plural number (irregular)

Adjectives and Adverbs 

-er comparative degree
-est superlative degree

Derivation 
Derivational suffixes can be divided into two categories: class-changing derivation and class-maintaining derivation. In English, they include
 -ise/-ize (usually changes nouns into verbs)
 -fy (usually changes nouns into verbs)
 -ly (usually changes adjectives into adverbs, but also some nouns into adjectives)
 -ful (usually changes nouns into adjectives)
 -able/-ible (usually changes verbs into adjectives)
 -hood (usually class-maintaining, with the word class remaining a noun)
 -ess (usually class-maintaining, with the word class remaining a noun)
 -ness (usually changes adjectives into nouns)
 -less (usually changes nouns into adjectives)
 -ism (usually class-maintaining, with the word class remaining a noun)
 -ment (usually changes verbs into nouns)
 -ist (usually class-maintaining, with the word class remaining a noun)
 -al (usually changes nouns into adjectives)
 -ish (usually changes nouns into adjectives/ class-maintaining, with the word class remaining an adjective)
 -oid (usually changes nouns into adjectives)
 -like (usually changes nouns into adjectives)
 -ity (usually changes adjectives into nouns)
 -tion/-ion/ation (usually changes verbs into noun)
 -logy/-ology (usually class-maintaining, with the word class remaining a noun)
  -ant (usually changes verbs into nouns, often referring to a human agent)

Synthetic languages 
Many synthetic languages—Czech, German, Finnish, Latin, Hungarian, Russian, Turkish, etc.—use many endings.

References

External links

 
Affixes
Linguistics terminology
English suffixes